She Would If She Could is a 1668 comedy play by the English writer George Etherege. It was originally staged at the Lincoln's Inn Fields Theatre by the Duke's Company.

The original cast included William Smith as Courtall, John Young as Freeman, Henry Harris as Sir Joslin, James Nokes as  Sir Oliver, Moll Davis as Getty and Anne Shadwell as Lady Cockwood.

References

Bibliography
 Fisk, Deborah Payne & Canfield, J. Douglas Cultural Readings of Restoration and Eighteenth-Century English Theater. University of Georgia Press, 2010.
 Van Lennep, W. The London Stage, 1660-1800: Volume One, 1660-1700. Southern Illinois University Press, 1960.

1668 plays
West End plays
Restoration comedy
Plays by George Etherege